Dappula IV was King of Anuradhapura in the 10th century, whose reign lasted from 939 to 940. He succeeded his father Kassapa V as King of Anuradhapura and was succeeded by his brother Dappula V.

See also
 List of Sri Lankan monarchs
 History of Sri Lanka

References

External links
 Kings & Rulers of Sri Lanka
 Codrington's Short History of Ceylon

Monarchs of Anuradhapura
D
D
D